This article provides a list of sites in the United Kingdom which are recognised for their importance to biodiversity conservation. The list is divided geographically by region and county.



Inclusion criteria
Sites are included in this list if they are given any of the following designations:

Sites of importance in a global context
 Biosphere Reserves (BR)
 World Heritage Sites (WHS) (where biological interest forms part of the reason for designation)
 all Ramsar Sites

Sites of importance in a European context
 all Special Protection Areas (SPA)
 all Special Area of Conservation (SAC)
 all Important Bird Areas (IBA)

Sites of importance in a national context
 all sites which were included in the Nature Conservation Review (NCR site)
 all national nature reserves (NNR)
 Sites of Special Scientific Interest (SSSI), where biological interest forms part of the justification for notification (SSSIs which are designated purely for their geological interest are not included unless they meet other criteria)

England

Southwest

Cornwall

Devon

Dorset

Somerset

Avon

Wiltshire

Gloucestershire

Southeast

Bedfordshire

Berkshire

Buckinghamshire

Essex

Greater London

Hampshire

Hertfordshire

Kent

Oxfordshire

Surrey

Sussex

Rye Harbour Nature Reserve

Midlands

Derbyshire

Herefordshire

Leicestershire

Northamptonshire

Shropshire

Staffordshire

Nottinghamshire

Warwickshire

Worcestershire

East Anglia

Northwest

Cheshire

Northeast

Lincolnshire

Yorkshire

County Durham

Wales

Anglesey

Scotland

Northeast Scotland

Shetland

Unst

Orkney

Outer Hebrides
Lewis and Harris 
North Uist, South Uist and Benbecula

Other islands

See also
 Conservation in the United Kingdom
 National Nature Reserves in the United Kingdom
 Sites of Special Scientific Interest

References

Biodiversity
Biodiversity